Phryganeutis cinerea is a moth of the family Oecophoridae. It is found in Western Australia, New South Wales, Queensland, South Australia, Tasmania and Victoria.

External links
Australian Faunal Directory

Oecophoridae
Moths of Australia